Wevaco is an unincorporated community and former coal town in Kanawha County, West Virginia, United States. Its post office  is closed.

The community's name is an acronym of the name of the local West Virginia Colliery Company.

References 

Unincorporated communities in West Virginia
Unincorporated communities in Kanawha County, West Virginia
Coal towns in West Virginia